The Penguin International Rugby Football Club, usually called the Penguins, is an invitational rugby union team based in Britain but with international players.  It was founded in 1959 and has played in 71 countries, claiming to be the most travelled sports club in the world.  The motto is "On court le ballon à la main" (One runs with the ball in hand).

There is also a charity, The Penguin International Rugby Football Trust, registered with the UK Charity Commission under Charity No 1081047, founded 1999, to promote the training of young people in Rugby throughout the world, and which is active in 17 countries apart from the UK.

It has annual matches against the universities of Oxford and Cambridge.  The 1988 one against Oxford was in memory of Peter Robbins, an alumnus.

The club plays teams of 7, 10 and 15 players. They first visited Asia with a tour of Sri Lanka in 1979, later doing well in the Hong Kong Sevens and winning the SCC International Sevens in Singapore in 2010.  They have won the COBRA Rugby Tens in Kuala Lumpur six times.  They won the Hong Kong Tens in 2013 and 2016.

References

Further reading

International rugby union teams
Multinational rugby union teams
British rugby union clubs